Elections to Strathclyde Regional Council were held on Tuesday 2 May 1978, on the same day as the eight other Scottish regional elections. This was the second election to the regional council following the local government reforms in 1974.

The election was the last to use the 103 electoral divisions created by the Formation Electoral Arrangements in 1974. Each electoral division elected one councillor using first-past-the-post voting.

Labour, who had won the previous election to Strathclyde Regional Council, retained a large majority by winning 72 of the 103 seats – up one from the previous election in 1974. The Conservatives remained as the second-largest party after winning 25 seats, an increase of five from the previous election. Despite increasing their vote share by 7.5%, the Scottish National Party (SNP) lost three seats to hold just two as they ended as the joint third-largest party with the Liberal Party who had remained on two seats. One Independent Ratepayer was elected but no other independent candidates were returned.

One seat remained vacant following the election after the poll in the Crosshill and Prospecthill electoral division was postponed due to the death of Labour candidate and convener of the regional council, the Rev. Geoff Shaw on 28 April.

Results

Source:

Electoral division results

Kilmarnock North

Kilmarnock South

Stewarton and Irvine Valley

Cumnock

New Cumnock and Doon Valley

Footnotes

References

Strathclyde
1978